Eastern Visayas Regional Science High School (Filipino: Mataas na Paaralan ng Agham Panrehiyon ng Silangang Visayas) is one of the campuses of the Regional Science High School Union under the supervision of the Bureau of Secondary Education of the Department of Education. It is located at San Roque, Catbalogan, Samar along the Arteche Boulevard.

Admission
Students who belong to upper 10% of the Grade 6 graduating class, recommended by their respective principals are qualified to take the entrance exam.

To acquire an entrance examination form, examinees should have:
 A final grade of 85% in English, Science and Mathematics
 A final grade of 83% in all other learning areas, and
 A weighted average of at least 85%.

Students should maintain a grade of 85 for major subjects and 83 in minor subjects. If a student fails to meet this requirement, he or she would be put under probation for the following year. If the student still fails to meet the requirements, he or she will be due to disqualification, hence, he or she is advised to transfer to another school by the end of the school year. He/she then is not anymore allowed to enroll once eliminated.

Curriculum
The school is following the new curriculum by the Department of Education, the Enhanced K to 12 Curriculum, as of the school year 2012-2013 and Curricula of English, Science and Mathematics shall be enriched by additional subjects and electives prescribed in DepEd Order no. 49, s. 2003.
 The school offers Senior High School with STEM (Science and Technology, Engineering and Mathematics) as the academic track since Science and Mathematics are the core subjects in the school.

References

Eastern Visayas
Science high schools in the Philippines
Schools in Catbalogan